Keith Stanley Murray Huntley (12 February 1931 – December 1995) was a Welsh amateur footballer who played in the Football League for Swansea Town as an outside left. He was capped by Wales at amateur level.

References 

Welsh footballers
English Football League players
Wales amateur international footballers
Association football outside forwards
1931 births
Footballers from Swansea
1995 deaths
Swansea City A.F.C. players